Ronin Warriors is a Japanese anime series and manga adaptation created by Hajime Yatate. The anime was produced and animated by Sunrise, and aired across Japan on Nagoya Television from April 30, 1988 to March 4, 1989 and has a total of 39 episodes. It was produced by Graz Entertainment and distributed by Cinar, and it was recorded by the Ocean Group. Ronin Warriors first aired on American television during the summer of 1995 and subsequently appeared through syndication, as well as the USA Network (1995), the Sci-Fi Channel (1996) and later on Cartoon Network (1999). From episodes 1-20, the opening theme is "Stardust Eyes" while the ending theme is "Faraway", both by Mariko Uranishi. From episodes 21-39, the opening theme is "Samurai Heart" while the ending is "Be Free", both by Hiroko Moriguchi. 

Three OVA sequels were produced: Gaiden (Side Story), The Legend of the Inferno Armor, and Message, which combined contain 11 episodes. Gaiden would have "Stardust Eyes" and "Faraway" for its opening and closing theme for its first episode, and have "Samurai Heart" and "Be Free" for its second. Legend of the Inferno Armor would have "Stardust Eyes" for its opening theme and "Samurai Heart" as its closing theme for every episode. For Message, the opening theme is "Tsukamae Teite" and its solo on episode 5 is "Hoshi no Lullaby", both by Kaori Futenma.

The series was released on DVD in 2002, including the original Japanese version with English subtitles on the reverse side of the disc. On September 4, 2014, North American anime licensor Discotek Media announced their license of the original Japanese anime (Yoroiden Samurai Troopers), and planned to release the series on DVD in 2015. Discotek has said that on their Facebook page that they have no plans to release Ronin Warriors until they clear issues with the dub. Discotek has also licensed the OVAs and includes both Japanese and English audio as well as English subtitles. However, by 2021 the issues had been resolved and the series' English dub had a Blu-ray release on December 28, 2021.

Episode list

OVAs

Ronin Warriors: Gaiden

Ronin Warriors: Legend of the Inferno Armor

Ronin Warriors: Message

References

External links
Ronin Warriors - Official Order at TheTVDB

Ronin Warriors